The Minister for Housing and Welfare was a Junior ministerial post in the Scottish Government. As a result, the Minister did not attend the Scottish Cabinet.

The post was created in May 2007 as the Minister of Communities and Sport, but was renamed in a February 2009 Ministerial reshuffle which saw responsibility for the Sport portfolio transfer to the Minister for Public Health.  The Minister originally reported (from 2007 to 2011) to the Cabinet Secretary for Health, Wellbeing and Sport, who had overall responsibility for the portfolio, and is a member of cabinet.  This changed after the 2011 election and subsequent reshuffle so that the Minister then reported to the Cabinet Secretary for Infrastructure, Investment and Cities.

This changed again in November 2014 and the Minister then reported to Alex Neil as Cabinet Secretary for Social Justice, Communities and Pensioners' Rights.  The Minister for Housing and Communities had specific responsibility for  social inclusion, equalities, anti-poverty measures, housing and regeneration.

Minister

History
From 1999 to 2000 Communities was the responsibility of the Minister for Communities and from 2000 to 2003 was the responsibility of the Minister for Social Justice, both of which were Cabinet positions. The Minister for Communities was reinstated after the 2003 Scottish Parliament election. The Sport portfolio was the responsibility of Deputy Minister for Communities and Sport from 2000 to 2001 in the Dewar Government (which was not a cabinet position). From 2000 to 2001 the Minister for the Environment, Sport and Culture was the Cabinet Minister with whose responsibilities included sport. From 2001 to 2003 these roles were combined in the Minister for Communities and Sport, which was renamed the Minister for Tourism, Culture and Sport after the addition of the tourism portfolio, following the 2003 election.

The Salmond government, elected following the 2007 Scottish Parliament election created the junior post of Minister for Communities and Sport, combining the Sport and Communities portfolios. The minister assisted the Cabinet Secretary for Health and Wellbeing.

In September 2012 the junior post of Minister for Housing and Welfare was announced, with a portfolio intended to reflect the important role of housing in aiding economic recovery and the challenges that face those in poverty.

On 18 May 2016 the post of Minister for Social Security was created and the Housing and Welfare brief was split between that post and Minister for Local Government and Housing.

See also
Scottish Parliament
Scottish Government

References

External links 
Cabinet and Ministers of the Scottish Government
Minister for Housing and Welfare

Housing and Welfare
Public housing in Scotland
Welfare in Scotland